This is a list of guest stars who appeared on Futurama, an animated comedy created by Matt Groening. Like Groening's other animated show, The Simpsons, Futurama features a large number of celebrity guests contributing their voices to the show, whether as themselves or as fictional characters. This list does not include those celebrities whose voices were impersonated. Due to the futuristic setting of the show the majority of the guest stars playing themselves are actually playing their own disembodied heads in a jar.

Guest stars are listed in chronological order by episode. Each episode's guest stars are listed in alphabetical order. People who guest star in multiple episodes are listed for each separate episode they appear in; as such if they play multiple roles in one episode these will be listed together.

There are several non-regular voices who make appearances but are credited as "also starring" and not guest voices. These voices are not mentioned here.

History
Guest stars have appeared on Futurama since its first season, in addition to the show's main cast of Billy West, Katey Sagal, John DiMaggio, Tress MacNeille, and Maurice LaMarche and supporting cast of Frank Welker, Kath Soucie, Dawnn Lewis, Nicole St. John and former supporting cast member Bumper Robinson. Phil LaMarr, Lauren Tom, and David Herman started as recurring actors in the first season, but joined the main cast starting with the sixth season. Tom Kenny was originally a recurring actor in the original run but became a guest actor since the fifth season.

Guest stars

 The color of the season number in the first column corresponds to the color of that season's DVD boxset.
 In the No. column:
 The first number refers to the order it aired during the entire series.
 The second number refers to the episode number within its season: i.e. 2ACV07 would be the seventh episode of the second season.
 The production code refers to the code assigned to the episode by the production team.
 Guests with "(archival)" after their names refer to cases where roles were not recorded specifically for the episode, but instead archival audio and/or footage from independent sources was used in the episode. In most cases these appearances have been uncredited and are usually not considered as proper guest stars given the circumstances.

Additional
Other guest star appearances in Futurama media. Some celebrity guest characters are included in Futurama: Worlds of Tomorrow, using audio lifted directly from the show. Only instances where new dialogue was recorded are included here.

References

Futurama lists
Futurama
Futurama